Mutual railway station is a Metrorail commuter rail station located between the suburbs of Maitland and Pinelands in Cape Town, South Africa. It is situated next to the South African headquarters of the Old Mutual, from which it takes its name. Mutual is a particularly busy station because it is the junction at which the Central Line towards Mitchell's Plain and Khayelitsha diverges from the Northern Line main line to Bellville.

The station is divided into two parts, connected by a platform-to-platform bridge. To the north there is a side platform and an island platform, serving three tracks of the Northern Line; to the south, an island platform containing a single bay, serving three tracks of the Central Line. There is a station building on either side of the tracks.

Notable places nearby
 Old Mutual South African headquarters
 Maitland Cemetery
 Pinelands Jewish Cemetery
 Conradie Hospital
 College of Cape Town Pinelands campus

Services

References

Railway stations in Cape Town
Metrorail Western Cape stations